Said Zahari ( – ) was a former Singaporean editor-in-chief of the Malay language newspaper Utusan Melayu, and an advocate of unbiased freedom of the press. Although he resided in Malaysia with his family, he insisted on retaining his Singapore citizenship.

Early life
Said was born in Singapore to Javanese parents. He led a journalists' strike against the takeover of the newspaper by United Malays National Organisation (UMNO).

Also known as Pak Said, he was detained on 2 February 1963 at 4.30 am by the Singapore Government and subsequently held for 17 years without trial. Allegations against him included being a "Communist". He now holds the distinction of being the second longest-serving political detainee in Singapore after Chia Thye Poh.

He was arrested during Operation Coldstore, a joint Malaysian and Singaporean operation to silence 117 opposition and union leaders under the Internal Security Act.

A documentary  made by film maker Martyn See about his 17 years as a political prisoner in Singapore was banned by the Board of Film Censors under the Films Act, which prohibit its possession and distribution.

In the documentary, Zahari recounts the events that follows his election as chairman of Parti Rakyat Singapura on the night before Operation Coldstore. He details his subsequent detention where he was kept in solitary confinement for long period in poor condition and explicitly threatened with death if he did not choose to confess his alleged crimes and cooperate with the authority. Part of the film shows Zahari conversing with the interviewer in fluent Mandarin, which he was taught during his forced detention without trial by fellow Chinese educated detainees, who were in the majority.

In a Singapore government media release highlighting the ban, it was stated that the documentary in question, "gives a distorted and misleading portrayal of Said Zahari's arrest and detention under the Internal Security Act in 1963".

Amnesty International recognizes Zahari as a former "prisoner of conscience."

Personal life
Said Zahari married Salamah Adul Wahab in 1955. He had 2 sons and 2 daughters.

Said Zahari died on 12 April 2016 at 12.30 pm (UTC+08:00) in Malaysia; his death was announced by his son Norman Said on his Facebook post.

Notable Works
Puisi Dari Penjara (Poems From Prison) (1973)
Meniti Lautan Gelora: Sebuah Memoir Politik (Dark Clouds At Dawn: A Political Memoir) (2001)
Dalam Ribuan Mimpi Gelisah: Memoir (The Long Nightmare: My 17 Years As A Political Prisoner) (2006)
Suara bicara: Fragment memoir Said Zahari (2016)

References

External links 
Said Zahari's long nights

1928 births
2016 deaths
Singaporean people of Javanese descent
Singaporean journalists
Singaporean prisoners and detainees
Amnesty International prisoners of conscience held by Singapore